The chapters of the Blue Exorcist manga series are written and illustrated by Kazue Kato.  The story revolves around Rin Okumura, a teenager who discovers he is the son of Satan born from a human woman and is the inheritor of Satan's powers. When Satan kills his guardian, Rin decides to become an exorcist in order to defeat his father.

Blue Exorcist has been serialized by Shueisha in the monthly manga magazine Jump Square since April 2009. The first tankōbon volume was released on August 4, 2009; twenty-eight volumes have been released as of November 2, 2022. The digital versions of the tankōbon in Japan are released in "Remastered" format, which include color on pages within each chapter that were originally printed in color in the monthly issues.

Outside Japan, the series is licensed in France by Kazé Manga, with the first volume released on May 27, 2010. The series was licensed by Viz Media for release in North America, who released the first volume on April 5, 2011; with overall twenty-seven volumes released as of May 3, 2022.



Volumes list

Chapters not yet in tankōbon format 
These chapters have yet to be published in a tankōbon volume. They were originally serialized in Japanese in the monthly issues of Jump SQ and in English in the issue of Weekly Shonen Jump that releases the week after the initial Japanese issue on Jump SQ. The following chapters were released from November 3, 2022.

See also 

 List of Blue Exorcist episodes
 List of Blue Exorcist characters
 Blue Exorcist

References

External links 
 Ao no Exorcist at Shueisha 
 Official Website 

Blue Exorcist